Sion is a small castle ruin in Chlístovice in the Central Bohemian Region of the Czech Republic. It lies near Kutná Hora. It was founded between 1426 and 1427 by Hussite Jan Roháč of Dubá. After a successful four-month siege the castle was conquered and burned by Emperor Sigismund's allies in 1437. Today, only scattered parts of the basement stone walls with some arches and stairs remain of the original castle.

References

Castles in the Central Bohemian Region
Kutná Hora District